The Ovation Guitar Company is a manufacturer of string instruments. Ovation primarily manufactures steel-string acoustic guitars (both 6 and 12-string versions) and nylon-string guitars, often with pickups for electric amplification. In 2015, it became a subsidiary of Drum Workshop after being acquired from KMCMusicorp.

The company's Ovation and Adamas guitars are known for their round backs, which gives them a recognizable shape. The latter are also well known for the use of carbon fiber tops (instead of the typically wood tops for acoustic guitars). 
Apart from guitars, the company currently produces acoustic basses, mandolins and ukuleles.

History

Founder Charles Kaman (1919–2011) developed the first prototypes of the Ovation guitar in 1965–1966.  Kaman, an amateur guitarist from an early age, worked on helicopter design as an aerodynamicist at United. Eventually, he founded a helicopter design company, Kaman Aircraft, in 1945.

The Kaman Corporation soon diversified, branching into nuclear weapons testing, commercial helicopter flight, development and testing of chemicals, and helicopter bearings production. In the early 1960s, however, financial problems from the failure of their commercial flight division forced them to expand into new markets, such as entertainment and leisure. Charles Kaman, still an avid guitar player, became interested in making guitars.

From 1966 to 2007, Ovation guitars, and later on Adamas guitars, were a brand of KMCMusicorp, which itself was a subsidiary of Kaman Aircraft.

In 2008, KMCMusicorp (and with that the Ovation brand) was sold to the Fender Musical Instruments Corporation. In 2014, Fender announced that they were closing the Ovation guitar factory in New Hartford, Connecticut, leaving all production of Ovation guitars overseas. Before that announcement, Fender established a U.S. production of various acoustic guitars in the New Hartford factory. Alongside Ovation and Adamas guitars, which were produced there for decades, Fender started a U.S. production of other Fender-owned brands in that factory, as is known, Guild (Guild Guitar Company) and Fender.

Shortly after closing the New Hartford factory it was announced that the Ovation brand had been sold to the company Drum Workshop, alongside a few other previously Fender-owned brands. The announcement was made on January 7, 2015. In addition to the Ovation brand, Drum Workshop also bought the New Hartford factory and reinstated the previously ceased U.S. production of Ovation and Adamas guitars, basses, ukuleles and mandolins.

Research and development of first models

Charles Kaman put a team of employees to work to invent a new guitar in 1964. For the project, Kaman chose a small team of aerospace engineers and technicians, several of whom were woodworking hobbyists as well. One of these was Charles McDonough, who created the Ovation Adamas model. Kaman founded Ovation Instruments, and in 1965 its engineers and luthiers (guitar makers) worked to improve acoustic guitars by changing their conventional materials. The R&D team spent months building and testing prototype instruments. Their first prototype had a conventional "dreadnought" body, with parallel front and back perpendicular to the sides. The innovation was the use of a thinner, synthetic back, because of its foreseen acoustic properties. Unfortunately, the seam joining the sides to the thin back was prone to breakage. To avoid the problem of a structurally unstable seam, the engineers proposed a synthetic back with a parabolic shape. By mid-1966, according to Ovation, they realized that the parabolic shape produced a desirable tone with greater volume than the conventional dreadnought.

Once the engineers had settled on a parabolic shape, they turned their attention to developing a substance that could be molded into this bowl-like shape. Using their knowledge of high-tech aerospace composites, they developed Lyrachord, a patented material comprising interwoven layers of glass filament and bonding resin.

The first successful design, built by luthier Gerry Gardner, went into production soon after the company was established.

The first Ovation guitar made its debut in November 1966. Its Lyrachord body gave the instrument, according to the company, unprecedented projection and ringing sustain. Compared to modern Ovation Guitars, the initial instruments had a shiny bowl that was used again, for example, in the Balladeer 40th anniversary re-issue.

Initial marketing

The introduction and promotion of the first Ovation was closely associated with two performing artists, the blues-performer Josh White and the country-music singer Glen Campbell.

Josh White
In 1966-1967, the Ovation Guitar Company produced a signature guitar for Josh White, which was the first signature guitar made for an African American. White was the first official Ovation endorser.

Upon completion, the first Ovation guitar was called the "Josh White Model," which White played at the Hotel America (Hartford, Connecticut), November 14, 1966; at the same show, the Balladeers played Balladeer models. The show was witnessed by "300 representatives of the press and the music industry"

Glen Campbell, 1968 
The Ovation Roundback Balladeer first caught national attention in 1968 when Glen Campbell hosted a variety show called The Glen Campbell Goodtime Hour on CBS, and in the following year, 1969, he became one of Ovation's first endorsers.

The Partridge Family, 1970 
Ovation guitars and amplifiers, together with musical instruments distributed by another Kaman company, Coast Wholesale Musical Co., were featured on The Partridge Family musical sitcom TV series.

Design innovations

Ovation guitar design reflects its founder's engineering training and development of Kaman helicopters. Ovation guitars replace the instrument's conventional back and sides with composite synthetic bowls. Kaman felt there were structural weaknesses in the orthogonal joining of the sides, and that a composite material could provide a smooth body. Ovation claims the parabolic bowls dramatically reduce feedback, allowing greater amplification. Improved synthetics techniques from helicopter engineering control vibrations in the bowl. Ovation developed a thin neck, striving for the feel of an electric guitar's neck, but with additional strength from layers of mahogany and maple reinforced by a steel rod in an aluminum channel. The composite materials and thin necks reduced weight.

For its soundboards, Ovation uses Sitka spruce, a wood that Kaman engineers used in helicopter blades. In the 1970s, Ovation developed thinner soundboards with carbon-based composites laminating a thin layer of birch in its Adamas model. The Adamas model dispersed the sound-hole of the traditional soundboard among 22 small sound holes in the upper chamber of the guitar, which Ovation says yields greater volume and further reduces feedback during amplification (pioneered in the Adamas model in 1977). Although the area of the multiple sound holes is equal to the area of a single-soundhole, the altered position allows a new style of guitar bracing (e.g. Adamas Bracing). The design strengthens the soundboard, reducing the traditional design's bracing and hence weight. In the 1980s, Ovation introduced shallow-bowl guitars to appeal to electric guitarists.

In 1977-1978, Gypsy, an Ovation performing and recording artist, designed the first stereo pre-amplifier for the Adamas 12 string and used it on his album "Ladies Love Outlaws." At the same time, Ovation provided small doors that blocked the sound holes from the inside in order to dampen feedback in the presence of loud stage monitors. Gypsy had also requested the addition of a round hatch in the back of the body of pre-Adamas guitars to facilitate changing the on-board battery, a feature that was then adopted for all the "round holes." Before this time, the strings on the round-hole guitars had to be removed to do this. On-board electronics let guitarists move about the stage rather than stay in front of a microphone. On-board electronic tuning, availability, uniformity, and frugal costs facilitated performances by guitar ensembles like Robert Fripp's Guitar Craft students. Ovation has also produced solid-body electric guitars and active basses.

Ovations reached the height of their popularity in the 1980s, where they were often seen during live performances by touring artists, such as Rush's Alex Lifeson or Paul Simon in The Concert in Central Park. Ovation guitars' synthetic bowl-shaped back and early use (1971) of pre-amplifiers, onboard equalization and piezo pickups were particularly attractive to live acoustic musicians who constantly battled feedback problems from the high volumes needed in live venues.

Ergonomics

When he became one of Ovation Guitars' first endorsers, Glen Campbell suggested reducing the weight of the guitar, which he had discovered caused back strain. After that, Ovation reduced the weight of several models and pioneered "super-shallow" guitar bodies.

While it was produced, Ovation's super-shallow 1867 Legend was the recommended guitar in Robert Fripp's Guitar Craft.  wrote that the acoustic 1867 Legend has "a gently rounded super-shallow body design that may be about as close to the shape and depth of an electric guitar as is possible without an intolerable loss of tone quality. Fripp liked the way the Ovation 1867 fitted against his body, which made it possible for him to assume the right-arm picking position he had developed using electric guitars over the years; on deeper-bodied guitars, the Frippian arm position is impossible without uncomfortable contortions."

Model overview

The Ovation Guitar Company produces guitars under the names Ovation and Adamas.

Ovation guitars have been also produced in China, South Korea and Indonesia. Import models generally have a wooden top. Recently, Ovation significantly reduced U.S production. From 2010 on, better models—Legend, Elite, Custom Legend, Custom Elite—were made both in the U.S. and in Korea. Before that, these models were U.S. made. In recent years, many U.S. made are identifiable by "LX" in the product name (e.g., Legend 2077LX), whereas Korean versions have "AX" in the model name (e.g., Legend 2077AX). Ovation does not use this convention on all models (e.g., Ovation 1617ALE). Currently, Ovation produces only a few U.S. made models, mostly signature and limited edition models (e.g., Custom Legend 1769-ADII Al DiMeola). Production of the standard model range of Ovation guitars in the U.S. had been ceased under the ownership of Fender Musical Instruments Corporation, but is planned to be reinstated by the new owner Drum Workshop.

The Adamas name mainly stands for guitars with a carbon fiber top, although there are exceptions (one is the Adamas 2081WT - WT stands for woodtop). Until the closure of the New Hartford, Connecticut factory in June 2014, all Adamas models were produced in the U.S. LX does not only stand for U.S. made. Originally LX indicated an Ovation guitar that included new features not available on previous models.

Back in 2007 Ovation explained on its website that new features included the new OP-Preamp, an advanced neck system (lightweight dual-action truss rod, carbon fiber stabilizers), a patented pickup (made of 6 elements), inlaid epaulets, scalloped bracing, and a new hard composite Lyrachord GS body. Back then, there was no AX model line. The first AX models appeared on the Ovation-website in 2010. Based on the website's history, the LX features were introduced in 2004.

Upper-level guitars: Balladeer, Legend and Elite
There are mainly two lines:
 Legend and Standard Balladeer models have one large sound hole as on most acoustic guitars (Standard Balladeer, Legend, Custom Legend - produced in Korea).
 Elites have several smaller sound holes (Standard Elite, Elite, Custom Elite - produced in Korea).

The first Ovation guitar model was a Balladeer (later known as Standard Balladeer)

Entry-level guitars: Applause and Celebrity 
Ovation has two lines of entry-level guitars.
Applause, the lowest cost line, with mainly laminated tops, is imported from China. Celebrity models are imported from China or Korea, and range from entry- to medium-level laminated-top models, to high-end, solid-top models with much ornamentation.

Electric guitars: Semi-hollow and solid bodies 
In 1967–1968, Ovation introduced its Electric Storm Series of semi-hollow archtop guitars and basses. The pickups for these instruments were manufactured by Schaller based in Germany. Production stopped in 1969.

In 1972, Ovation introduced one of the first production solid-body electric-guitars with active electronics, the Ovation Breadwinner. The model did not become popular, however, and production of the Breadwinner and the Ovation Deacon ceased in 1980. Ovation made several other solid-body models up until the mid 1980s.  Since that time, the company has focused mainly on acoustic and acoustic-electric guitars.

Other instruments: acoustic bass guitars, ukuleles, mandolins 
Apart from guitars, Ovation has manufactured other string instruments such as acoustic bass guitars, ukuleles, and mandolins.

See also
 Kaman Music Corporation
 Kaman Aircraft
 Ovation UKII

Bibliography

References

Comprehensive history

Model

External links

 

Guitar manufacturing companies of the United States
Manufacturing companies based in Hartford, Connecticut
Design companies established in 1965
Mandolin makers
Ukulele makers
Manufacturing companies established in 1965
1965 establishments in Connecticut
2015 mergers and acquisitions